Francesco Forgione (b. August 15, 1960), born in Catanzaro, Italy, is a member of the Italian Chamber of Deputies and the Communist Refoundation Party. He was chairman of the Antimafia Commission in 2006–2008.

References

Living people
1960 births
20th-century Italian politicians
21st-century Italian politicians
Communist Refoundation Party politicians
Antimafia
People from Catanzaro